Qaytiyya was a Palestinian Arab village in the Safad Subdistrict. It was depopulated during the 1948 War on May 19, 1948, by the Palmach's First Battalion of Operation Yiftach. It was located 28 km northeast of Safad, bordering both the Hasibani and the Dan Rivers.

History
In 1881, the PEF's Survey of Western Palestine (SWP)  described  El Keitîyeh, while under Ottoman rule, as a village of 80 Muslims built of adobe and surrounded by streams: occupied during spring and harvest.
bordering both the Hasibani and the Dan Rivers.

British Mandate era
In the 1931 census of Palestine, under of the British Mandate in Palestine, Qeitiya had a population of 824  Muslims,  in  a total of 163  houses.

In  the 1945 statistics, Qeitiya had a population of 940 Muslims, and the total land area was 5,390 dunums. Of this,  19 dunums were for citrus and bananas, 4,465 for  plantations and irrigable land, 44 for  cereals, while 93 dunams were built-up (urban) land.

1992, aftermath
In 1992 the village site was described: "Only a few stones from the old village are still visible. The surrounding land is cultivated, except for a small section that contains stone rubble and is overgrown with thorny plants and eucalyptus trees."

References

Bibliography

 
 

 
  
(Morris, 2004,  pp.  251,  511 - 512,  539)

External links
 Welcome To Qaytiyya
Qaytiyya, Zochrot
Qaytiyya, dr Ritz
Survey of Western Palestine, map 2:  IAA, Wikimedia commons

Arab villages depopulated during the 1948 Arab–Israeli War
District of Safad